Odrick Ray (born May 24, 1989) is a former American football defensive end and defensive tackle. He was signed by the Jaguars as an undrafted free agent in 2011. He played college football at Tulsa.

Professional career

Jacksonville Jaguars
Ray signed with the Jacksonville Jaguars following the 2011 NFL Draft as a rookie free agent. Ray was cut on September 3, 2011, during final cuts.

On May 7, 2012, Ray was re-signed after a workout with the Jaguars. On August 31, he was waived/injured. He was released from injured reserve on October 15.

External links
Tulsa Hurricane bio
Jacksonville Jaguars bio

References

1989 births
Living people
People from Athens, Texas
Players of American football from Texas
Tulsa Golden Hurricane football players
American football defensive ends
Jacksonville Jaguars players
Iowa Barnstormers players